Francisco Gómez Palacio y Bravo (May 29, 1824, in Victoria de Durango, Durango, Mexico – February 27, 1886, in Victoria de Durango, Durango) was a Mexican writer, educator, jurist and Liberal politician. He served twice as governor of the State of Durango (1867–68 and 1880–83). In October 1887 he was declared Benemérito of the state by the Legislature.

Biography
Gómez's parents, Victoriano Gómez del Palacio and Manuela Bravo, were Spaniards by birth. Gómez studied in the Seminario Conciliar of Durango, considered at this time to be the best educational institution in northern Mexico. He grew up in an atmosphere of culture, with excellent teachers, and came to love scholarship. He was fluent in six foreign languages — Greek, Latin, English, French, German and Italian. He was considered one of the most cultured men of his time, not only in Durango but in the country. His speeches were enriched with quotes from classical and world thinkers.

He translated Mark Twain's novel Life on the Mississippi into Spanish.

Gómez was the founder of the Civil College of the State, now Juárez University of Durango, as well as rector and professor at the college. In addition to his terms as governor of Durango, he also served three times in the Mexican Congress.

Political career
Most of his life was spent in the politics of his native state. He served in the following positions:

Secretary of the interior in the administration of Governor Pedro Ochoa Natera, from April to September 1847
Deputy to the national Congress, from 1848 to 1849
Administrator of the government income from tobacco, from 1854 to 1855
Rector of the State College in 1856 and director of the College of Law
In 1857 he was elected a deputy to the Constituent Congress, but he did not take up the position because he was named a member of the Mixed Claims Commission with the United States, when the latter country claimed many millions of pesos of indemnification. He helped reduce the claims to a minimum
Attorney general of Mexico
From 1862 to 1863 he was successively mayor of Durango, justice of the state supreme court and secretary of the interior in the state administration of Benigno Silva
On December 2, 1867, he became governor of the State of Durango, a position he held until December 20, 1868. During this time he supported in Congress the accusations against federal deputy Benigno Canto over the assassination of General José María Patoni. He got Canto removed from office and arrested. Canto died in prison without revealing the reasons for the assassination.
On September 16, 1880, he again took office as governor of Durango, after winning elections. He served until September 16, 1883, when he resigned over his inability to get the Mexican Central Railroad to arrive at Durango, something he had promised the inhabitants of the city.

Death
Attorney Francisco Gómez Palacio died on February 27, 1886, in the city of Durango. That same year Santiago Lavín Cuadra donated land for the foundation of the city of Gómez Palacio, Durango, named in his honor. It now has nearly 250,000 people.

1824 births
1886 deaths
Governors of Durango
Politicians from Durango
Writers from Durango
People from Durango City